Solomon Joseph Schiff (June 28, 1917 – February 26, 2012) was a Jewish-American table tennis player from New York.

He attended Textile High School in New York City.

Table tennis career
Schiff was a six-time U.S. Open Men's Doubles champion, and nine-time U.S. Mixed Doubles champion. In 1936, he won the U.S. Men's Singles title.

From 1937 to 1947, he won four medals in doubles and team events in the World Table Tennis Championships. The four World Championship medals included two gold medals; one in the doubles with Jimmy McClure at the 1938 World Table Tennis Championships and one in the team event at the 1937 World Table Tennis Championships.

He also won an English Open title.

He was inducted into the USA Table Tennis Hall of Fame. He was also inducted into the International Jewish Sports Hall of Fame.

See also
 List of table tennis players
 List of World Table Tennis Championships medalists

References

1917 births
2012 deaths
American male table tennis players
Sportspeople from Manhattan
Jewish table tennis players
Jewish American sportspeople
International Jewish Sports Hall of Fame inductees
21st-century American Jews